Mojtame-ye Meskuni Shahrak-e Azadegan (also Romanized as Mojtame`-ye Meskūnī Shahrak-e Āzādegān) is a village in Natel Kenar-e Olya Rural District, in the Central District of Nur County, Mazandaran Province, Iran. At the 2006 census, its population was 452, in 131 families.

References 

Populated places in Nur County